Prince is a 2022 Indian Tamil-language romantic comedy film written and directed by Anudeep K. V. which is produced by Suniel Narang, D. Suresh Babu, Pushkar Ram Mohan Rao under the banners of Sree Venkateswara Cinemas and Suresh Productions. The film stars Sivakarthikeyan, Maria Ryaboshapka and Sathyaraj. It revolves around a teacher from Pondicherry falling in love with a British teacher from his school, which attracts opposition from others in the town.

Principal photography began in February 2022 and ended by that September. The music is composed by Thaman S, with cinematography and editing handled by Manoj Paramahamsa and Praveen K. L. respectively. Prince was released on 21 October 2022, three days before Diwali. The film received negative reviews from critics, and failed at the box office.

Plot 
Anbarasan is a secondary school social science teacher in Pondicherry. He is loved by his students as he was an irresponsible and carefree teacher who didn't prioritise his students' studies. This always got the school principal disappointed. Anbu came from a rich and successful family, his father is Ulaganathan. In his village, where caste and religion are still used, Ulaganathan completely disregarded this and encouraged the villagers to stop practising these. Ulaganathan is embarrassed as his daughter eloped and married her cousin (Ulaganathan didn't approve of inter-family marriage) without his consent. He hopes that Anbu won't follow these steps and makes him sign a document regarding the same.

Meanwhile, Jessica, a British woman born and raised in India finds a job as an English teacher in the same school in which Anbu works. Anbu develops a crush on her and tries to show off whenever around her. However, her father Williams wants to move out of their house and return to England. His ownership of the land is challenged by Boopathy. Boopathy discriminates against Williams stating he is not an Indian in an attempt to take over his property. Jessica's student Mahesh scores a 6/25. The principal is disappointed in Jessica, so Anbu decided to tutor Mahesh. His grade improves to 18/25, Jessica notices this and develops a liking for Anbu. Anbu confesses his love, at first she is doubtful, but soon reciprocates these feelings. Williams takes his case to the police, but his case is withdrawn. Anbu tells his parents about Jessica, and Jessica comes to meet them. She states she is from the French Colony, of Cambridge. Ulaganathan finds her a nice woman, and Anbu and Jessica are happy.

Anbu starts supporting Williams's case, by telling Boopathy to stop, but Williams still dislikes Anbu (believing he is like all Indians and just as discriminative). Ulaganathan had believed the entire time Jessica was French, but when he realised she was actually British, he disapproved of Anbu and Jessica's relationship. This was mainly because Ulaganthan's grandfather, the respected Veluchamy, was killed by the British. At a pub, Anbu and Jessica celebrate Anbu's friend's birthday. They inadvertently start celebrating when England defeats India in a cricket match, Boopathy believes they are celebrating India's defeat. A fight occurs, and Anbu hits Boopathy's head, which starts bleeding. Williams sees this and realises Anbu is different and actually a good man. He invites him for dinner and Anbu learns that his family had lived in India for 50 years. Jessica's grandmother had fled to India when World War II occurred.

Every year, Ulaganthan is given the honour to raise the Indian flag every 15 August (India's Independence Day). However, this year he is not allowed, because of his son's actions of hitting Boopathy and supporting a British. Ulaganthan believes that Boopathy actually owned the land (he didn't know the truth). Ulaganathan is angry and alongside the villagers wait at the doorstep of Williams's house. There he confronts Williams. Williams wants to talk with Ulaganthan in private, when he tries to guide Ulaganathan into his house, the villagers pulli on him and Ulaganthan falls into the mud. Though it was the villagers' fault, the villagers spread rumours that Williams pushed him into the mud. This soon becomes a revolt and the villagers assemble in front of Williams's house and throw rocks at his house.

Williams has no choice but to take his entire family back to England. Anbu and his friends start fighting the protesting villagers, but the police are called and he's taken alongside his friends. He is exiled from his village for a week. Jessica goes to Ulaganthan's house and tells him the truth, she also on behalf of the Britishers who ruled India apologised for ruling them. Ulaganathan and his wife feel pity for Jessica and her family. Before Anbu is kicked out, he makes a speech. He eventually says patriotism or humanity. The villagers realise their mistake and let Anbu back in. Anbu catches up to Williams, Jessica, and their grandmother who had been pulled over. They all apologise and Ulaganthan wholeheartedly welcomes them back into the village, promising to treat them with respect and also accepting Anbu and Jessica's love.

Cast 

 Sivakarthikeyan as Aanand/Anbarasan (Anbu) 
 Maria Ryaboshapka as Jessica
 Sathyaraj as Ulaganathan and Ulaganathan's grandfather Veluchamy (dual role)
 Premgi Amaren as Boopathy
 Subbu Panchu as DRO
 Pramodhini as Aanand's mother
 Carl A. Harte as Williams
 Svetlana Grigorashchenko as Jessica's grandmother
 Sabita Roy as abroad guy's wife
 Rethika Srinivas as school principal
 Sathish Krishnan as Anbu's friend 1
 Prankster Rahul as Anbu's friend 2
 Finally Bhaarath as Anbu's friend 3
 VTV Ganesh as Doctor
 Pondy Ravi as SI
 Gnanaprasad as Boopathy henchman
 Smrudhi as Malar
 Anandha Kannan as Ulaganathan's son in law
 Harishankarnath as vegetable shop Ganapathy
 Master Shakthi as Mahesh
 Madhavan as student 2
 Saathvik as student 3
 S.R. Ranjith as reporter
 Hello Kandasamy as villager
 George Vijay as villager
 Finally Raj as villager
 Anandaraj as Inspector Muthupandi, cameo appearance
 Soori as abroad guy, cameo appearance
 Anudeep K. V., cameo appearance

Production

Development 
The film was announced in January 2022, under the working title SK20. Directed by Anudeep KV, the film is produced by Suniel Narang, Suresh Babu D, Pushkar Ram Mohan Rao under the banners of Sree Venkateshwara Cinemas and Suresh Productions respectively.

In June 2022, it was announced that the film was titled as Prince. While many sources reported the film would be a Tamil-Telugu bilingual, Sivakarthikeyan clarified that it was shot in Tamil only.

Filming 
Principal photography commenced in February 2022. In March 2022, Ukrainian actress Maria Ryaboshapka joined the sets. As of May 2022, 90 percent of filming was completed with only a song left to shoot. The final schedule commenced in May 2022 in Pondicherry. The filming finished in end-September after doing some re-shoots.

Music 

The music is composed by Thaman S in his first collaboration with Sivakarthikeyan. The first single "Bimbiliki Pilapi" was released on 1 September 2022, the second single "Jessica" on 23 September, and the third single "Who Am I?" on 14 October.

Release

Theatrical 
Prince was released on 21 October 2022 alongside a Telugu-dubbed version, three days before Diwali. Earlier it was planned to release on 31 August 2022, but it was later postponed due to unknown reasons.

Home media 
The digital rights of the film were sold to Disney+ Hotstar, and the satellite rights to Star India Network. The film premiered on Disney+ Hotstar from 25 November 2022 in Tamil and dubbed versions of Telugu, Malayalam and Kannada languages.

Reception 
Prince received negative reviews from critics.

Sakshi Post rated the film 3.25 out of 5 stars and wrote "Sivakarthikeyan's film is a laugh riot and a total paisa vasool". Arvind V of Pinkvilla rated the film 3 out of 5 stars and wrote "While Jathi Ratnalu looked every bit homegrown, Prince looks half-manufactured. This is not to say that the film is unfunny. It has its moments". Kirubhakar Purushothaman of The Indian Express rated the film 2.5 out of 5 stars and wrote "Director Anudeep's brand of comedy is unique and might not be for everyone". Soundarya Athimuthu of The Quint rated the film 2.5 out of 5 stars and wrote "Prince has interesting elements and does make you laugh at times, but just that it feels like a film that would have worked better had it come a few years back when he was still not the big thing he is today. Unfortunately, he has set his bars high". M. Suganth of The Times of India rated the film 2 out of 5 stars and wrote "Even Sivakarthikeyan, who turns on the comic persona from his early films that made him a star, is only able to just about keep the film from sinking".

Janani K of India Today rated the film 2 out of 5 stars and wrote "Prince is a madcap comedy that tries to make the audience laugh throughout its runtime. But, you get only occasional laughs in the latter half". Priyanka Sundar of Firstpost rated the film 2 out of 5, calling it a mixed bag and wrote "For those who enjoy the grand comic set-up with momentary payoff, for those who have the patience to relate with such elaborate set up, it is an enjoyable entertainer". Bharathy Singaravel of The News Minute rated the film 1 out of 5 stars and wrote "Romance, comedy or reference to colonial history, Telugu director Anudeep KV's first foray into Kollywood has no grasp of all three". Lakshmi Subramanian of The Week rated the film 1 out of 5 stars and wrote "Sivakarthikeyan looks good as always. But the actor fails to deliver the laughs that Prince promised". Navein Darshan of Cinema Express gave the film's rating 2.5/5 stars and wrote that "The title Prince doesn't bear much relevance to the actual film, except as a tribute to its star actor." The film failed at the box office, and Sivakarthikeyan agreed to compensate distributors who suffered losses.

References

External links 
 

2020s Tamil-language films
2022 romantic comedy films
Films about interracial romance
Films directed by Anudeep K. V.
Films scored by Thaman S
Indian romantic comedy films